Autonoë (Ancient Greek: Αὐτονόη) may refer to the following:
Autonoe (moon), a moon of Jupiter
Autonoe (Greek mythology), characters appearing in the literature of Greece.